Søren Nystrøm Rasted (born Søren Rasted on 13 June 1969) is a Danish musician, singer, songwriter and record producer. He plays keyboards, guitar and sings backing vocals. He is a member of the Danish-Norwegian Eurodance group Aqua.

Musical career
Rasted was a member of the Danish pop-dance group Aqua. He and his fellow band member Claus wrote and produced the three Aqua albums Aquarium, Aquarius and Megalomania. Aqua was formed in 1994 and split up in 2001, but reunited in 2008. The band sold more than 28 million records worldwide, and appeared in the Guinness Book of Records as the only debut band with three "self penned" Number One hits in the UK.

In 2004 Rasted released the spoken word album Lazyboy TV under the name Lazyboy. The album included the singles "Facts of Life", "Inhale Positivity" and "Underwear Goes Inside the Pants".

Rasted has worked as producer and songwriters on various Danish artists such as Sort Sol writing their "Holler High". Rasted also worked with Jon on "Right Here Next to You" and "This Side Up". He also wrote the single "Teardrops in Heaven" for Sanne Salomonsen, The single "Det bedste til sidst" for X-Factor winner Linda, and the single for Mathias Pachler "Mit Et & Alt".

In 2006 Rasted wrote and arranged music for "Det Kgl Teater", the music for the Royal Danish Opera ballet American Mixtures.

Rasted is a member of the Danish band Hej Matematik.

He has also made various TV scores and film scores, including - in collaboration with Nicolaj Rasted - score music for the Jonatan Spang movie "Talenttyven" (2012).

In 2009, Aqua released their second greatest hits album, for which Rasted produced three new songs: "Back to the 80's", "Live Fast - Die Young" and "My Mamma Said". In 2011, Aqua released their third album Megalomania.

In 2012, Rasted started the Label LabelLand, distributed by ArtPeople, and released "2012 Shift Happens", the first Lazyboy track in seven years.

Personal life

On 25 August 2001, Rasted married fellow Aqua band member Lene Nystrøm, with the ceremony being held in Las Vegas. In 2004 the couple moved to Denmark from London. Together, they have a daughter, India, and a son, Billy.

In 2017 the couple divorced after fifteen years of marriage.

Discography

with Aqua
 1996 Roses are red
 1997 My Oh My
 1997 Aquarium – (ALBUM)
 1997 Barbie Girl
 1997 Dr. Jones
 1997 Goodmorning Sunshine
 1997 Lollipop/Candyman U.S. Version
 1998 Turn Back Time
 1998 Diddnt I (The B Sides)
 1998 Aquarium – The Remixes –  (ALBUM)
 2000 Cartoon Heroes
 2000 Aquarius –  (ALBUM)
 2000 Around the world
 2000 Bumble bees
 2000 We belong to the sea
 2000 Freaky Friday – For the U.S. Motion Picture
 2000 Halloween
 2009 Back to the 80s
 2009 My Mamma Said
 2009 Aqua – Best of – (ALBUM)
 2011 How R U Doin'?
 2011 Playmate To Jesus

For Jon
 2002 Right here next to you
 2002 This side up
 2002 Endlessly

For Sort Sol
 2003 Holler High
 2003 Golden Wonder

For Sanne Salomonsen
 2003 Teardrops in heaven

For Lene
 2003 Scream

For Linda
 2009 Bedste til sidst (X-Factor winner-song)

with Lazyboy
 2004 Facts of life
 2004 Underwear goes inside the pants
 2004 LazyboyTV (ALBUM)
 2004 Inhale Positivity
 2004 It's all about love
 2012 2012 – Shift Happens

with Hej Matematik
 2007 Gymnastik
 2007 Centerpubben
 2008 Du og Jeg
 2008 Walkmand
 2008 Vi Burde Ses Noget Mere (ALBUM)
 2009 Party I Provinsen
 2010 Alt Går Op I 6 (ALBUM)
 2010 Legendebørn
 2010 Kato på maskinerne
 2011 The Loser Sign
 2012 Livet i Plastik
 2012 Det blir en go dag. Feat. Ankerstjerne
 2012 Sikke en fest

for Mathias Pachler
 2012 Mit Et & Alt

Score songs for the soundtrack to the motion picture Talenttyven
 2012 Ovre mig
 2012 Jo-Ann

References

External links

 
 LazyB
 
 

1969 births
Living people
Aqua (band) members
Danish pop musicians
Danish dance musicians
Danish record producers
Danish songwriters
Danish expatriates in the United Kingdom
Pop keyboardists
People from Allerød Municipality
English-language singers from Denmark